Angharad James may refer to:

Angharad James (footballer) (born 1994), Welsh football midfielder
Angharad James (poet) (1677–1749), 17th–18th century Welsh harpist and poet